The Städtebahn Sachsen was a railway company that operated regional train services in Saxony, Germany by order of Verkehrsverbund Oberelbe. Städtebahn was a subsidiary of Nordbayerische Eisenbahngesellschaft (NBE) and started its operations in 2010.

On 25 July 2019, Städtebahn ceased all its services due to financial difficulties, resulting in the leasing contract of the rolling stock being terminated by the rolling stock owner. After 72 hours of no trains, Verkehrsverbund Oberelbe terminated the contract with Städtebahn to operate regional trains (due to run until 2024), and Mitteldeutsche Regiobahn took over.

Services 

 RE19 (Wintersport Express) Dresden Hbf – Heidenau – Glashütte (Sachs) – Kurort Altenberg (Erzgebirge)
 partly along Děčín–Dresden-Neustadt railway
 along Heidenau–Kurort Altenberg railway
 service only during winter season
 RB33 Dresden-Neustadt – Königsbrück
 partly along Görlitz–Dresden railway
 partly along Dresden-Klotzsche–Straßgräbchen-Bernsdorf railway
 daily service 
 RB34 Dresden Hbf – Kamenz
 partly along Děčín–Dresden-Neustadt railway
 partly along Görlitz–Dresden railway
 partly along Kamenz–Pirna railway
 daily service 
 RB71 Pirna – Neustadt (Sachs) – Sebnitz
 partly along Kamenz–Pirna railway (Dürröhrsdorf–Pirna section)
 along Neustadt–Dürrröhrsdorf railway
 partly along Bautzen–Bad Schandau railway (Neustadt–Sebnitz section)
 daily service 
 RB72 Heidenau – Mühlbach bei Pirna – Glashütte (Sachs) – Geising – Kurort Altenberg (Erzgebirge)
 along Heidenau–Kurort Altenberg railway
 daily service

References

External links 
 

Defunct railway companies of Germany
Transport in Saxony
Companies based in Dresden